5-Geranyloxy-7-methoxycoumarin is a natural coumarin with the molecular formula C20H24O4. It is found in the essential oils of citrus such as bergamot.

References

Coumarins